Bobija (Serbian Cyrillic: Бобија) is a mountain in western Serbia, near the town of Ljubovija.

References

External links
Photo story of Bobija 

Mountains of Serbia

sh:Bobija